Lajeado Grande River may refer to one of these rivers in the state of Rio Grande do Sul, Brazil:
 Lajeado Grande River (Das Antas River)
 Lajeado Grande River (Rio da Várzea)